Nikola Srdić (born 1952 in Belgrade, Yugoslavia) is a Serbian clarinetist and Professor of Clarinet at the University of Novi Sad Academy of Arts, Serbia and University of Banja Luka Academy of Arts, Bosnia and Herzegovina.  He was a student of Prof. Bruno Brun

References

External links
University of Novi Sad Academy of Arts
University of Banja Luka Academy of Arts
Academic staff at the University of Novi Sad Department of Music, Retrieved on July 17, 2009
Biography at the website of the Anton Eberst International Competition, Retrieved on August 7, 2009

Serbian classical clarinetists
Academic staff of the University of Novi Sad
Academic staff of the University of Banja Luka
1952 births
Living people
University of Arts in Belgrade alumni
21st-century clarinetists